The men's triple jump event at the 1994 Commonwealth Games was held on 27 and 28 August at the Centennial Stadium in Victoria, British Columbia.

Medalists

Results

Qualification

Qualification: Qualifying Performance 16.80 (Q) or 12 best performers (q) advance to the Final.

Final

References

Triple
1994